Phtheochroa decipiens is a species of moth of the family Tortricidae. It is found in Russia (the southern Ural Mountains, the Caucasus), Syria, Central Asia and Iran.

The wingspan is 14–18 mm. Adults have been recorded on wing from June to August.

The larvae feed on Berberis species.

References

Moths described in 1900
Phtheochroa